Gladys Marie Stein (October 19, 1900 - October 9, 1989) was an American author, composer, music educator, and pianist who published articles and books about rhythm bands, as well as musical compositions.
Stein was born in Meadville, Pennsylvania, to Albertha Hood and Henry Stein. She had one brother. She graduated from the Pennsylvania College of Music in 1922 and the New England Conservatory in 1924. She also studied at Thiel College, the Pittsburgh Musical Institute, the Erie Conservatory, and the University of Pittsburgh. In 1929, she founded the Stein School of Music at 1109 W. 26th Street, Erie, Pennsylvania. 

Stein’s works were published by Ludwig & Ludwig (see Ludwig Drums). They included:

Band 

Dancing Along

Dancing Americans

Happy Little Robin

Hummer’s Waltz

In Tulip Time

Polish Dance

Redbird

Scouts on Parade

Song of the Young Braves

Springtime Frolic

Waltz of the Toys

Books 

Tuned Time Bell

Rhythm Band Instruction

Tuned Resonator Bell and Rhythm Instructor

Piano 

Melodies to Play

Red Feather

Soldiers on Parade

References 

American women composers
American music educators
1900 births
1989 deaths
New England Conservatory alumni